Lizotte is a surname. Notable people with the surname include:

Abel Lizotte (1870–1926), Major League Baseball first baseman who played for the Pittsburgh Pirates in 1896
Alan Lizotte, American criminologist
Blake Lizotte (born 1997), American ice hockey player
Fernand Lizotte (1904–1996), Canadian politician and a five-term Member of the Legislative Assembly of Quebec
Linda Lizotte-MacPherson, Canadian public servant
Louis Philippe Lizotte (1891–1972), Quebec political figure
Mark Lizotte (born 1966), American-born Australian musician who uses the pseudonym Diesel
Simon Lizotte, German professional disc golfer
Simonne Lizotte, independent candidates for public office in Nicolet, Quebec

See also
Lizotte Creek, a meltwater stream from the southwestern tip of Matterhorn Glacier to the northeast end of Lake Bonney in Taylor Valley, Victoria Land, Antarctica